Broadwell may refer to:

Places

England
 Broadwell, Oxfordshire
 RAF Broadwell
 Broadwell, Warwickshire
 Broadwell, Cotswold, Gloucestershire
 Broadwell, Forest of Dean, Gloucestershire

United States
 Broadwell, Illinois
 Broadwell Township, Logan County, Illinois
 Broadwell, Kentucky

Other uses
 Broadwell (microarchitecture), an Intel microarchitecture codename
 Broadwell (surname)

See also
 Broadwell Ring, a small ring in French and German artillery
 Bradwell (disambiguation)